is a retired Japanese sprinter who specialized in the 400 metres.

He won bronze medals in 4 × 400 metres relay at the 1993 and 1995 World Indoor Championships

In 1998 he won the silver medal at the Asian Championships, and was subsequently selected to represent Asia in 4 × 400 metres relay at the 1998 IAAF World Cup. The Asian team finished sixth with teammates Ibrahim Ismail Faraj, Sugath Tillakaratne and fellow Japanese Kenji Tabata. In May the same year he clocked a career best time of 45.33 seconds in Osaka.

International competitions

References

External links
 
 
 

1972 births
Living people
Sportspeople from Chiba Prefecture
Japanese male sprinters
Olympic male sprinters
Olympic athletes of Japan
Athletes (track and field) at the 1992 Summer Olympics
Universiade medalists in athletics (track and field)
Asian Games gold medalists for Japan
Asian Games medalists in athletics (track and field)
Athletes (track and field) at the 1998 Asian Games
Medalists at the 1998 Asian Games
Universiade silver medalists for Japan
Medalists at the 1993 Summer Universiade
World Athletics Championships athletes for Japan
World Athletics Indoor Championships medalists
Japan Championships in Athletics winners
20th-century Japanese people
21st-century Japanese people